Persoonia oxycoccoides  is a species of flowering plant in the family Proteaceae and is endemic to New South Wales. It is a spreading to prostrate shrub with smooth bark, hairy young branchlets, elliptic to egg-shaped leaves and yellow flowers arranged in groups of up to thirteen along a rachis that continues to grow after flowering.

Description
Flowering occurs from December to April.

Taxonomy
Persoonia oxycoccoides was first formally described in 1827 by Kurt Polycarp Joachim Sprengel in the 17th edition of Systema Vegetabilium from an unpublished description by Franz Sieber.

Distribution and habitat
This geebung grows in montane heath and in forest between Mittagong, Jamberoo and Tallong in south-eastern New South Wales.

References

oxycoccoides
Flora of New South Wales
Plants described in 1827
Taxa named by Franz Sieber
Taxa named by Kurt Polycarp Joachim Sprengel